The Escudo de Veraguas Formation is a geologic formation in Panama. It preserves fossils dating back to the Piacenzian to Early Pleistocene period.

Fossil content 
Among others, the following fossils have been found in the formations:
 Cancellaria stri
 Diaphus aequalis

See also 
 List of fossiliferous stratigraphic units in Panama

References

Bibliography 
 
 

Geologic formations of Panama
Neogene Panama
Pleistocene Panama
Paleontology in Panama
Siltstone formations
Sandstone formations
Deep marine deposits
Formations